Valesca is a given name. Notable people with the name include:
 Valesca Machado (born 1996), Brazilian mixed martial artist
 Valesca Popozuda (born 1978), Brazilian singer, dancer and reality show contestant